The Tehoshi-class (テホシ) locomotives were a class of steam tender locomotives of the Chosen Government Railway (Sentetsu) with 4-6-0 wheel arrangement. The "Teho" name came from the American naming system for steam locomotives, under which locomotives with 4-6-0 wheel arrangement were called "Ten Wheeler".

After the Liberation of Korea, of the 178 surviving locomotives of all Teho classes - including six previously owned by private railway companies - 106 went to the Korean National Railroad in the South, and 72 to the Korean State Railway in the North.

Description
Following the brief excursion to ALCo for the Tehosa class, Sentetsu once again returned to Baldwin for the next order of 4-6-0s. This was a small lot of four locomotives built in 1913, initially numbered 235–238 and intended for local freight trains, and had a lower profile than the previous Baldwin designs. They were renumbered 661–664 in 1918, finally being designated テホシ (Tehoshi) class in the 1938 general renumbering, numbered テホシ1 through テホシ4.

Postwar

Korean State Railway 더우너 (Tŏunŏ) class
All four locomotives of the class went to the North after the partition, where they were designated 더우너 (Tŏunŏ) class by the Korean State Railway and numbered 더우너1 through 더우너4, but little is known of their service lives and subsequent fates.

Construction

References

Locomotives of Korea
Locomotives of North Korea
Railway locomotives introduced in 1913
4-6-0 locomotives
Baldwin locomotives